The 2015–16 Philadelphia 76ers season was the second worst in franchise history, one game better than their 9–73 mark in the 1972–73 season. It was also the second straight season that Joel Embiid, the third pick in the 2014 NBA draft, would not suit up for the 76ers due to a leg injury. Philadelphia broke the record for the longest losing streak in American professional sports history with 27 straight losses over this season and last season with a 114–116 loss to the Houston Rockets (the old record of 26 was held by the 2010-11 Cleveland Cavaliers). The losing streak would reach to 28 games (with the 18 straight losses tying the record for longest opening season losing streak with the 2009–10 New Jersey Nets) before getting their first victory at home against the Los Angeles Lakers, which was also Kobe Bryant's last game against the 76ers in Philadelphia. Philadelphia would also hire former Phoenix Suns owner, coach, general manager, and four-time NBA Executive of the Year winner Jerry Colangelo on December 7, 2015, as their Chairman of Basketball Operations. Eleven days later, former Denver Nuggets, Phoenix Suns, New York Knicks, and Los Angeles Lakers head coach Mike D'Antoni would join the team as an associate head coach. Near the end of the season, general manager Sam Hinkie would announce his resignation from his position, being replaced by Jerry's son Bryan Colangelo before the end of the season. Jerry would also announce his personal demotion from his original position afterwards.

The 76ers finished just one game shy of tying the NBA record for most losses in a season set by themselves during their 1972–73 season when they went 9–73. They became only the second team after the Vancouver Grizzlies between 1995–96 and 1997–98 to endure three consecutive 82-game seasons with fewer than twenty wins. However, it would be the season where Sam Hinkie's goal of "The Process" came into full fruition since they'd later earn the #1 selection in the 2016 NBA draft, which became Ben Simmons.

Draft picks

Preseason game log

Preseason

|- style="background:#fbb;"
| 1
| October 6
| @ Washington
| 95–129
| Canaan, Noel (13)
| Jerami Grant (8)
| Isaiah Canaan (6)
| Verizon Center11,670
| 0–1
|- style="background:#bfb;"
| 2
| October 8
| Cleveland
| 115–114
| Jerami Grant (19)
| Nerlens Noel (15)
| Robert Covington (6)
| Wells Fargo Center8,229
| 1–1
|- style="background:#bfb;"
| 3
| October 10
| Brooklyn
| 97–95
| Robert Covington (23)
| Robert Covington (8)
| Isaiah Canaan (8)
| Times Union Center6,737
| 2–1
|- style="background:#fbb;"
| 4
| October 12
| @ New York
| 88–94
| Isaiah Canaan (18)
| Christian Wood (10)
| Aldemir, Grant, McRae, Wilbekin (2)
| Madison Square Garden19,255
| 2–2
|- style="background:#fbb;"
| 5
| October 16
| Washington
| 118–127
| Scottie Wilbekin (21)
| Furkan Aldemir (14)
| T. J. McConnell (10)
| Wells Fargo Center10,798
| 2–3
|- style="background:#fbb;"
| 6
| October 18
| @ Brooklyn
| 91–92
| Nerlens Noel (15)
| Nerlens Noel (11)
| Nerlens Noel (5)
| Barclays Center10,756
| 2–4
|- style="background:#fbb;"
| 7
| October 23
| @ Boston
| 65–81
| Jahlil Okafor (12)
| Nerlens Noel (9)
| Canaan, Jackson (3)
| Verizon Wireless Arena8,403
| 2–5

Regular season game log

|-bgcolor=#ffbbbb
| 1
| October 28
| @ Boston
| 
| Jahlil Okafor (26)
| Nerlens Noel (12)
| T. J. McConnell (4)
| TD Garden18,624
| 0–1
|- bgcolor=#ffbbbb
| 2
| October 30
| Utah
| 
| Grant, Stauskas (12)
| Nerlens Noel (10)
| T. J. McConnell (4)
| Wells Fargo Center17,122
| 0–2

|- bgcolor=#ffbbbb
| 3
| November 2
| Cleveland
| 
| Jahlil Okafor (24)
| Nerlens Noel (8)
| T. J. McConnell (12)
| Wells Fargo Center18,094
| 0–3
|- bgcolor=#ffbbbb
| 4
| November 4
| @ Milwaukee
| 
| Jahlil Okafor (21)
| Nerlens Noel (12)
| T. J. McConnell (12)
| BMO Harris Bradley Center12,437
| 0–4
|- bgcolor=#ffbbbb
| 5
| November 6
| @ Cleveland
| 
| Noel, Okafor (18)
| Nerlens Noel (12)
| Canaan, McConnell (4)
| Quicken Loans Arena20,562
| 0–5
|- bgcolor=#ffbbbb
| 6
| November 7
| Orlando
| 
| Isaiah Canaan (23)
| T. J. McConnell (8)
| T. J. McConnell (9)
| Wells Fargo Center15,207
| 0–6
|- bgcolor=#ffbbbb
| 7
| November 9
| Chicago
| 
| Jahlil Okafor (21)
| Jahlil Okafor (15)
| T. J. McConnell (8)
| Wells Fargo Center13,879
| 0–7
|- bgcolor=#ffbbbb
| 8
| November 11
| Toronto
| 
| Jahlil Okafor (26)
| Jerami Grant (10)
| T. J. McConnell (13)
| Wells Fargo Center12,744
| 0–8
|- bgcolor=#ffbbbb
| 9
| November 13
| @ Oklahoma City
| 
| Christian Wood (15)
| Nerlens Noel (11)
| McConnell, Stauskas (3)
| Chesapeake Energy Arena18,203
| 0–9
|- bgcolor=#ffbbbb
| 10
| November 14
| @ San Antonio
| 
| Jahlil Okafor (21)
| Jahlil Okafor (12)
| Phil Pressey (6)
| AT&T Center18,717
| 0–10
|- bgcolor=#ffbbbb
| 11
| November 16
| Dallas
| 
| Jahlil Okafor (19)
| Nerlens Noel (12)
| T. J. McConnell (6)
| Wells Fargo Center11,555
| 0–11
|- bgcolor=#ffbbbb
| 12
| November 18
| Indiana
| 
| T. J. McConnell (16)
| Hollis Thompson (9)
| Phil Pressey (5)
| Wells Fargo Center11,080
| 0–12
|- bgcolor=#ffbbbb
| 13
| November 20
| @ Charlotte
| 
| Nerlens Noel (16)
| Nerlens Noel (16)
| T. J. McConnell (6)
| Time Warner Cable Arena17,926
| 0–13
|- bgcolor=#ffbbbb
| 14
| November 21
| @ Miami
| 
| Isaiah Canaan (22)
| Jahlil Okafor (11)
| T. J. McConnell (5)
| American Airlines Arena19,673
| 0–14
|- bgcolor=#ffbbbb
| 15
| November 23
| @ Minnesota
| 
| Jahlil Okafor (25)
| Jahlil Okafor (12)
| T. J. McConnell (8)
| Target Center11,382
| 0–15
|- bgcolor=#ffbbbb
| 16
| November 25
| @ Boston
| 
| Jahlil Okafor (19)
| Robert Covington (14)
| Phil Pressey (4)
| TD Garden17,588
| 0–16
|- bgcolor=#ffbbbb
| 17
| November 27
| @ Houston
| 
| Robert Covington (28)
| Robert Covington (7)
| T. J. McConnell (6)
| Toyota Center17,306
| 0–17
|- bgcolor=#ffbbbb
| 18
| November 29
| @ Memphis
| 
| Isaiah Canaan (16)
| Jahlil Okafor (13)
| T. J. McConnell (6)
| FedEx Forum15,322
| 0–18

|- bgcolor=#bbffbb
| 19
| December 1 *
| L.A. Lakers
| 
| Robert Covington (23)
| Nerlens Noel (9)
| T. J. McConnell (6)
| Wells Fargo Center20,510
| 1–18
|- bgcolor=ffbbbb
| 20
| December 2
| @ New York
| 
| Hollis Thompson (13)
| Nerlens Noel (6)
| Canaan, Covington (3)
| Madison Square Garden19,812
| 1–19
|- bgcolor=ffbbbb
| 21
| December 5
| Denver
| 
| Robert Covington (18)
| Robert Covington (10)
| T. J. McConnell (6)
| Wells Fargo Center14,367
| 1–20
|- bgcolor=ffbbbb
| 22
| December 7
| San Antonio
| 
| Covington, Noel, Stauskas (13)
| Covington, Noel (6)
| Isaiah Canaan (5)
| Wells Fargo Center14,449
| 1–21
|- bgcolor=ffbbbb
| 23
| December 10
| @ Brooklyn
| 
| Jahlil Okafor (22)
| Jahlil Okafor (10)
| Nik Stauskas (5)
| Barclays Center13,266
| 1–22
|- bgcolor=ffbbbb
| 24
| December 11
| Detroit
| 
| Jahlil Okafor (22)
| Nerlens Noel (10)
| Kendall Marshall (6)
| Wells Fargo Center14,020
| 1–23
|- bgcolor=ffbbbb
| 25
| December 13
| @ Toronto
| 
| Jahlil Okafor (23)
| Jahlil Okafor (14)
| Kendall Marshall (5)
| Air Canada Centre19,800
| 1–24
|- bgcolor=ffbbbb
| 26
| December 14
| @ Chicago
| 
| Jahlil Okafor (22)
| Jahlil Okafor (8)
| Hollis Thompson (4)
| United Center21,166
| 1–25
|- bgcolor=ffbbbb
| 27
| December 16
| @ Atlanta
| 
| Isaiah Canaan (24)
| Holmes, Okafor (7)
| Covington, Marshall, McConnell (4)
| Philips Arena14,827
| 1–26
|- bgcolor=#ffbbbb
| 28
| December 18
| New York
| 
| Jahlil Okafor (20)
| Hollis Thompson (7)
| Canaan, McConnell, Marshall, Wroten (3)
| Wells Fargo Center17,880
| 1–27
|- bgcolor=#ffbbbb
| 29
| December 20
| @ Cleveland
| 
| Nerlens Noel (15)
| Nerlens Noel (12)
| Kendall Marshall (5)
| Quicken Loans Arena20,562
| 1–28
|- bgcolor=#ffbbbb
| 30
| December 22
| Memphis
| 
| Jahlil Okafor (18)
| Covington, Noel (8)
| Tony Wroten (7)
| Wells Fargo Center15,552
| 1–29
|- bgcolor=#ffbbbb
| 31
| December 23
| @ Milwaukee
| 
| Jahlil Okafor (17)
| Jahlil Okafor (8)
| Kendall Marshall (7)
| BMO Harris Bradley Center15,754
| 1–30
|- bgcolor=#bbffbb
| 32
| December 26
| @ Phoenix
| 
| Isaiah Canaan (22)
| Nerlens Noel (11)
| Ish Smith (5)
| Talking Stick Resort Arena17,548
| 2–30
|- bgcolor=#ffbbbb
| 33
| December 28
| @ Utah
| 
| Ish Smith (22)
| Nerlens Noel (6)
| Ish Smith (11)
| Vivint Smart Home Arena19,911
| 2–31
|- bgcolor=bbffbb
| 34
| December 30
| @ Sacramento
| 
| Nerlens Noel (20)
| Jerami Grant (11)
| Ish Smith (9)
| Sleep Train Arena17,317
| 3–31

|- bgcolor=ffbbbb
| 35
| January 1
| @ L.A. Lakers
| 
| Nerlens Noel (15)
| Nerlens Noel (12)
| T. J. McConnell (7)
| Staples Center18,997
| 3–32
|- bgcolor=ffbbbb
| 36
| January 2
| @ L.A. Clippers
| 
| Jahlil Okafor (23)
| Nerlens Noel (8)
| Ish Smith (10)
| Staples Center19,212
| 3–33
|- bgcolor=bbffbb
| 37
| January 4
| Minnesota
| 
| Ish Smith (21)
| Nerlens Noel (9)
| Ish Smith (11)
| Wells Fargo Center14,013
| 4–33
|- bgcolor=ffbbbb
| 38
| January 7
| Atlanta
| 
| Jahlil Okafor (21)
| Nerlens Noel (13)
| Ish Smith (7)
| Wells Fargo Center12,611
| 4–34
|- bgcolor=ffbbbb
| 39
| January 9
| Toronto
| 
| Ish Smith (28)
| Nerlens Noel (8)
| T. J. McConnell (8)
| Wells Fargo Center14,100
| 4–35
|- bgcolor=ffbbbb
| 40
| January 10
| Cleveland
| 
| Jahlil Okafor (21)
| Nerlens Noel (9)
| Ish Smith (10)
| Wells Fargo Center19,226
| 4–36
|- bgcolor=ffbbbb
| 41
| January 14
| Chicago
| 
| Robert Covington (25)
| Covington, Noel (6)
| Ish Smith (8)
| Wells Fargo Center14,063
| 4–37
|- bgcolor=bbffbb
| 42
| January 16
| Portland
| 
| Jahlil Okafor (25)
| Jahlil Okafor (10)
| T. J. McConnell (7)
| Wells Fargo Center15,698
| 5–37
|- bgcolor=ffbbbb
| 43
| January 18
| @ New York
| 
| Jahlil Okafor (20)
| Nerlens Noel (16)
| Ish Smith (16)
| Madison Square Garden19,812
| 5–38
|- bgcolor=bbffbb
| 44
| January 20
| @ Orlando
| 
| Jahlil Okafor (20)
| Robert Covington (11)
| Ish Smith (11)
| Amway Center17,746
| 6–38
|- bgcolor=ffbbbb
| 45
| January 24
| Boston
| 
| Robert Covington (25)
| Nerlens Noel (9)
| Ish Smith (4)
| Wells Fargo Center9,722
| 6–39
|- bgcolor=bbffbb
| 46
| January 26
| Phoenix
| 
| Ish Smith (20)
| Nerlens Noel (9)
| Ish Smith (9)
| Wells Fargo Center10,851
| 7–39
|- bgcolor=ffbbbb
| 47
| January 27
| @ Detroit
| 
| Jerami Grant (21)
| Covington, Grant (8)
| McConnell, Smith (6)
| The Palace of Auburn Hills13,712
| 7–40
|- bgcolor=ffbbbb
| 48
| January 30 *
| Golden State
| 
| Isaiah Canaan (18)
| Robert Covington (13)
| Ish Smith (9)
| Wells Fargo Center20,798
| 7–41

|- bgcolor=ffbbbb
| 49
| February 3
| Atlanta
| 
| Nik Stauskas (17)
| Nerlens Noel (7)
| Ish Smith (7)
| Wells Fargo Center10,429
| 7–42
|- bgcolor=ffbbbb
| 50
| February 5
| @ Washington
| 
| Ish Smith (22)
| Nerlens Noel (8)
| Ish Smith (5)
| Verizon Center17,305
| 7–43
|- bgcolor=bbffbb
| 51
| February 6
| Brooklyn
| 
| Jahlil Okafor (22)
| Jahlil Okafor (17)
| T. J. McConnell (6)
| Wells Fargo Center18,847
| 8–43
|- bgcolor=ffbbbb
| 52
| February 8
| L.A. Clippers
| 
| Smith, Thompson (16)
| Jerami Grant (11)
| Ish Smith (5)
| Wells Fargo Center13,310
| 8–44
|- bgcolor=ffbbbb
| 53
| February 10
| Sacramento
| 
| Robert Covington (29)
| Jahlil Okafor (10)
| Ish Smith (10)
| Wells Fargo Center12,501
| 8–45
|- bgcolor="bbcaff"
|colspan="9" | 2016 All-Star Break
|- bgcolor=ffbbbb
| 54
| February 19
| @ New Orleans
| 
| Nerlens Noel (24)
| Nerlens Noel (9)
| Ish Smith (7)
| Smoothie King Center16,953
| 8–46
|- bgcolor=ffbbbb
| 55
| February 21
| @ Dallas
| 
| Jahlil Okafor (31)
| Jahlil Okafor (8)
| T. J. McConnell (6)
| American Airlines Center20,194
| 8–47
|- bgcolor=ffbbbb
| 56
| February 23
| Orlando
| 
| Ish Smith (22)
| Nerlens Noel (11)
| Ish Smith (5)
| Wells Fargo Center13,745
| 8–48
|- bgcolor=ffbbbb
| 57
| February 24
| @ Detroit
| 
| Hollis Thompson (19)
| Richaun Holmes (7)
| Marshall, Stauskas (4)
| The Palace of Auburn Hills13,429
| 8–49
|- bgcolor=ffbbbb
| 58
| February 26
| Washington
| 
| Jahlil Okafor (21)
| Robert Covington (12)
| Ish Smith (8)
| Wells Fargo Center16,511
| 8–50
|- bgcolor=ffbbbb
| 59
| February 28
| @ Orlando
| 
| Jahlil Okafor (26)
| Jerami Grant (8)
| Ish Smith (7)
| Amway Center16,168
| 8–51
|- bgcolor=ffbbbb
| 60
| February 29
| @ Washington
| 
| Ish Smith (25)
| Grant, Noel (6)
| Ish Smith (7)
| Verizon Center15,096
| 8–52

|- bgcolor=ffbbbb
| 61
| March 2
| Charlotte
| 
| Canaan, Covington, Noel (17)
| Robert Covington (9)
| Ish Smith (8)
| Wells Fargo Center11,143
| 8–53
|- bgcolor=ffbbbb
| 62
| March 4
| Miami
| 
| Ish Smith (26)
| Ish Smith (8)
| Ish Smith (8)
| Wells Fargo Center17,610
| 8–54
|- bgcolor=ffbbbb
| 63
| March 6
| @ Miami
| 
| Ish Smith (21)
| Robert Covington (9)
| Ish Smith (5)
| American Airlines Arena19,820
| 8–55
|- bgcolor=ffbbbb
| 64
| March 9
| Houston
| 
| Ish Smith (21)
| Nerlens Noel (9)
| Ish Smith (5)
| Wells Fargo Center15,237
| 8–56
|- bgcolor=bbffbb
| 65
| March 11
| Brooklyn
| 
| Carl Landry (16)
| Nerlens Noel (11)
| Ish Smith (9)
| Wells Fargo Center14,128
| 9–56
|- bgcolor=ffbbbb
| 66
| March 12
| Detroit
| 
| Isaiah Canaan (22)
| Hollis Thompson (7)
| Nik Stauskas (5)
| Wells Fargo Center16,087
| 9–57
|- bgcolor=ffbbbb
| 67
| March 15
| @ Brooklyn
| 
| Isaiah Canaan (20)
| Carl Landry (8)
| Nik Stauskas (6)
| Barclays Center14,560
| 9–58
|- bgcolor=ffbbbb
| 68
| March 17
| Washington
| 
| Ish Smith (20)
| Nerlens Noel (16)
| Ish Smith (7)
| Wells Fargo Center10,521
| 9–59
|- bgcolor=ffbbbb
| 69
| March 18
| Oklahoma City
| 
| Nik Stauskas (23)
| Nerlens Noel (9)
| Ish Smith (7)
| Wells Fargo Center20,388
| 9–60
|- bgcolor=ffbbbb
| 70
| March 20
| Boston
| 
| Carl Landry (26)
| Grant, Landry, Noel (8)
| Ish Smith (8)
| Wells Fargo Center15,103
| 9–61
|- bgcolor=ffbbbb
| 71
| March 21
| @ Indiana
| 
| Canaan, Thompson (15)
| Ish Smith (9)
| McConnell, Smith (4)
| Bankers Life Fieldhouse16,155
| 9–62
|- bgcolor=ffbbbb
| 72
| March 23
| @ Denver
| 
| T. J. McConnell (17)
| Robert Covington (9)
| Ish Smith (8)
| Pepsi Center10,684
| 9–63
|- bgcolor=ffbbbb
| 73
| March 26
| @ Portland
| 
| Covington, Thompson, Smith (17)
| Ish Smith (14)
| Ish Smith (9)
| Moda Center19,506
| 9–64
|- bgcolor=ffbbbb
| 74
| March 27
| @ Golden State
| 
| Carl Landry (22)
| Robert Covington (11)
| Ish Smith (10)
| Oracle Arena19,596
| 9–65
|- bgcolor=ffbbbb
| 75
| March 29
| Charlotte
| 
| Robert Covington (18)
| Hollis Thompson (10)
| Ish Smith (6)
| Wells Fargo Center14,486
| 9–66

|- bgcolor=ffbbbb
| 76
| April 1
| @ Charlotte
| 
| Grant, Thompson (17)
| Elton Brand (11)
| T. J. McConnell (7)
| Time Warner Cable Arena19,244
| 9–67
|- bgcolor=ffbbbb
| 77
| April 2
| Indiana
| 
| Isaiah Canaan (24)
| Elton Brand (10)
| Ish Smith (7)
| Wells Fargo Center19,213
| 9–68
|- bgcolor=bbffbb
| 78
| April 5
| New Orleans
| 
| Carl Landry (21)
| Carl Landry (9)
| T. J. McConnell (8)
| Wells Fargo Center10,978
| 10–68
|- bgcolor=ffbbbb
| 79
| April 8
| New York
| 
| Robert Covington (30)
| Robert Covington (11)
| Ish Smith (7)
| Wells Fargo Center16,076
| 10–69
|- bgcolor=ffbbbb
| 80
| April 10
| Milwaukee
| 
| Ish Smith (22)
| Nerlens Noel (13)
| T. J. McConnell (9)
| Wells Fargo Center16,267
| 10–70
|- bgcolor=ffbbbb
| 81
| April 12
| @ Toronto
| 
| Robert Covington (24)
| Nerlens Noel (10)
| Ish Smith (4)
| Air Canada Centre19,800
| 10–71
|- bgcolor=ffbbbb
| 82
| April 13
| @ Chicago
| 
| Robert Covington (27)
| Nerlens Noel (6)
| T. J. McConnell (9)
| United Center21,777
| 10–72

   Denotes home game sellout.

Announcers

Roster

Roster Notes
 Center Joel Embiid missed the entire season due to a right foot injury.

Awards
The following are some awards that took place during the 2015 season for Sixers players.
 Eastern Conference Rookie of the Month (Jahlil Okafor) December
 Eastern Conference Rookie of the Month (T. J. McConnell) February
 NBA All-Rookie First Team (Jahlil Okafor)

Transactions

Trades

Free agents

Additions

Subtractions

References

Philadelphia 76ers seasons
Philadelphia 76ers
Philadelphia 76ers
Philadelphia 76ers